Sachtjen is a surname. Notable people with the surname include:

Herman W. Sachtjen (1886–1978), American politician and jurist
Tracy Sachtjen (born 1969), American curler